The 2021–22 Top 14 competition was the 123rd French domestic rugby union club competition operated by the Ligue Nationale de Rugby (LNR).

Teams

Number of teams by regions

Competition format
The top six teams at the end of the regular season (after all the teams played one another twice, once at home, once away) enter a knockout stage to decide the Champions of France. This consists of three rounds: the teams finishing third to sixth in the table play quarter-finals (hosted by the third and fourth placed teams). The winners then face the top two teams in the semi-finals, with the winners meeting in the final at the Stade de France in Saint-Denis.

The LNR uses a slightly different bonus points system from that used in most other rugby competitions. It trialled a new system in 2007–08 explicitly designed to prevent a losing team from earning more than one bonus point in a match, a system that also made it impossible for either team to earn a bonus point in a drawn match. LNR chose to continue with this system for subsequent seasons.

France's bonus point system operates as follows:

 4 points for a win.
 2 points for a draw.
 1 bonus point for scoring at least 3 more tries than the opponent. This replaces the standard bonus point for scoring 4 tries regardless of the opponent scoring.
 1 bonus point for losing by 5 points (or fewer). The margin had been 7 points until being changed prior to the 2014–15 season.

Table

Relegation
From the 2017–18 season, only the 14th placed team is automatically relegated to the Pro D2. The 13th placed team play the runner-up of the Pro D2 play-off, with the winner taking up the final place in the Top 14 for the following season.

Fixtures & results

Round 1

Round 2

Round 3

Round 4

Round 5

Round 6

Round 7

Round 8

Round 9

Round 10

Relegation playoff
The team finishing in 13th place faces the runner-up of the Pro D2, with the winner of this match playing in the 2022–23 Top 14 and the loser in the 2022–23 Pro D2.

Playoffs

Semi-final Qualifiers

Semi-finals

Final

See also
 2021–22 Rugby Pro D2 season

Notes

References

 
Top 14 seasons